Shambyu is a traditional Kavango kingdom in what is today Namibia. Its people speak the Shambyu language.

References 
 Rundu / Kavango in Namibia - Travel Information and Accommodation

History of Namibia
Kavango Region